Cobimetinib, sold under the brand name Cotellic, is an anti-cancer medication used in combination with vemurafenib (Zelboraf) alone or with both vemurafenib and atezolizumab (Tecentriq) to treat melanoma. Cobimetinib is a MEK inhibitor. Cotellic, Zelboraf, and Tecentriq are all marketed by Genentech.

The most common side effects include diarrhea, rash, nausea (feeling sick), vomiting, pyrexia (fever), photosensitivity (light sensitivity) reaction, abnormal results for certain liver function tests (increased levels of alanine aminotransferase, aspartate aminotransferase) and abnormal results for an enzyme related to muscle breakdown (creatine phosphokinase).

Cobimetinib was approved for medical use in the United States in November 2015.

Medical use 
Cobimetinib is approved for use in combination with vemurafenib for the treatment of advanced melanoma with BRAF mutation (either V600E or V600K) that cannot be removed by surgery or which has metastasized.

In the European Union, cobimetinib is indicated for use in combination with vemurafenib for the treatment of adults with unresectable or metastatic melanoma with a BRAF V600 mutation.

Atezolizumab in combination with cobimetinib and vemurafenib is indicated for the treatment of people with BRAF V600 mutation-positive unresectable or metastatic melanoma.

Adverse effects 
Common adverse effects observed in cobimetinib and vemurafenib co-treated persons in clinical trials included diarrhea, nausea, vomiting, rash, photosensitivity, and pyrexia.

History 
Cobimetinib was granted orphan drug status by the US Food and Drug Administration (FDA) for malignant melanoma with BRAFV600 mutation in 2014, and for histiocytic neoplasms in 2021.

Acquired resistance to BRAF inhibitors, such as vemurafenib and dabrafenib, commonly occurs after several months of progression-free tumor response.  Preclinical data indicated the involvement of MAPK pathways and MAPK-independent signaling in the developed resistance, suggesting dual inhibition of MEK and BRAF kinase as a strategy for increasing the longevity of tumor response seen with BRAF inhibition alone.

In phase III clinical trials, the combination of cobimetinib and vemurafenib was tested in patients with BRAFV600-mutated metastatic melanoma, which resulted in significant improvement in progression-free survival in patients, but also produced some increase in toxicity. The combination increased progression-free survival to an average of 12.3 months, compared to 7.2 months for vemurafenib alone. This clinical data also showed that the combination treatment resulted in 65% survival rate of patients 17 months after beginning the treatment, increased rates from the 50% of patients on vemurafenib treatment alone. Adding cobimetinib also increased the median overall survival to 25.6 months, compared to the 18 months for vemurafenib alone.

Pre-clinical investigation suggests that combined use of cobimetinib with PI3K inhibition could boost the anti-cancer effects of the drug, with a synergistic response being observed in lung cancer cell lines.

The U.S. Food and Drug Administration (FDA) approved cobimetinib based on evidence from one clinical trial of 495 participants with melanoma containing the BRAF V600 mutation that was advanced or could not be removed by surgery. The trial was conducted at 133 sites in 19 countries including those in North America, Europe, and Australia.

References

External links 
 
 

Azetidines
Benzamides
Experimental cancer drugs
Fluoroarenes
Iodoarenes
MEK inhibitors
Piperidines
Protein kinase inhibitors
Hoffmann-La Roche brands
Genentech brands
Orphan drugs